Dino Staffa (14 August 1906 – 7 August 1977) was an Italian cardinal of the Roman Catholic Church. He served as prefect of the Apostolic Signatura from 1967 until his death, and was elevated to the cardinalate in 1967.

Biography

Early life and ordination
Dino Staffa was born in Santa Maria in Fabriago, Lugo, to Domenico and Emilia (née Gualandi) Staffa. He studied at the seminary in Imola from 1917 to 1922, and then entered the Pontifical Regional Seminary of Bologna, where the future Marcello Cardinal Mimmi was rector. After earning his doctorate in theology, Staffa was ordained to the priesthood by Bishop Paolino Tribbioli, OFM Cap, on 25 May 1929.

Pastoral work
He then did pastoral work in Imola until 1931, and furthered his studies at the Pontifical Roman Athenaeum Saint Apollinare in Rome, from where he obtained a doctorate in canon and civil law in 1933. While performing pastoral ministry in Rome from 1933 to 1950, Staffa was raised to the rank of privy chamberlain of his holiness on 4 January 1936.

Curial work
He taught history of canon law at the Pontifical Lateran University from 1941 to 1944, when he was made auditor of the Roman Rota in the Roman Curia on 20 November. Staffa was named secretary of the Sacred Congregation of Seminaries and Universities on 18 December 1958. In this position, he would serve as the second-highest official of that dicastery, under Cardinal Giuseppe Pizzardo.

Archbishop
On 3 September 1960 Staffa was appointed Titular Archbishop of Caesarea in Palaestina in association with his post as secretary of Seminaries and Universities. He received his episcopal consecration on the following 28 October from Pope John XXIII, with Archbishop Diego Venini and Bishop Benigno Carrara serving as co-consecrators, in St. Peter's Basilica. From 1962 to 1965, Staffa attended the Second Vatican Council.

Cardinal
Pope Paul VI, whose reign Staffa predicted to be "truly great", later named him as pro-prefect of the Apostolic Signatura on 7 April 1967, and created him cardinal priest of S. Cuore di Cristo Re in the consistory of 26 June 1967. 

Staffa became full prefect of the Apostolic Signatura on 26 March 1969. In 1972, the cardinal lowered the high costs involved in receiving an annulment from the Roman Rota.

Staffa was made cardinal priest of Santa Maria sopra Minerva on 24 May 1976 and later died in Rome seven days short of his 71st birthday. He was buried in his family's tomb in Massa Lombarda.

Views

Catholic universities
The archbishop was believed to have written a decree issued by his congregation on 25 May 1963 that demanded that Catholic universities receive the Vatican's approval before awarding honorary degrees.

Hans Küng
After Saint Louis University in the US state of Missouri granted an honorary doctorate of laws to the liberal theologian Hans Küng, Staffa claimed that Catholic universities had been giving out several honorary degrees to those "not worthy of merit". He also said that "there are many periti of the Council who speak stupidities" and that "if we give honorary doctorates to him, it would seem that we approve his ideas".

Collegiality
Not overly supportive of collegiality, Staffa once declared that "supreme power over the entire flock of the faithful was entrusted to Peter and Peter alone".

References

External links
Cardinals of the Holy Roman Church
Catholic-Hierarchy

1906 births
1977 deaths
People from Lugo, Emilia-Romagna
20th-century Italian cardinals
Participants in the Second Vatican Council
Members of the Congregation for Catholic Education
Prefects of the Apostolic Signatura
Cardinals created by Pope Paul VI
Roman Catholic titular archbishops of Caesarea